is a side-scrolling run and gun game produced by Data East and released in arcades in 1989. Midnight Resistance is set in a dystopian future where the player controls a member of a resistance movement who goes on a mission to rescue his kidnapped family from a drug kingpin.

It was ported to the Sega Mega Drive in 1991 as Data East's first video game for the console. The game was also adapted by Ocean Software to home computers.

Plot
In the arcade version, two nameless brothers are on a mission to rescue their family from an entity known as King Crimson.

In the Sega Genesis/Mega Drive version, the main character is Johnny Ford who is a member of an operative group who shuts down drug cartels in South America. After completing his last mission, Johnny returned home only to find it in shambles, and he sees a note in which King Crimson kidnapped his entire family. The reason for the abduction is that Johnny's father, Malcolm Ford, was developing a serum which could help people break their addictions to all narcotics.  Since the government is unable to help Johnny, he sets off on his own to rescue his family and destroy King Crimson's empire of evil for good.

Gameplay

Midnight Resistance uses play mechanics and controls similar to that of the Contra series, and can be played by up to two players simultaneously (except Sega Mega Drive/Genesis). The main distinguishing feature is the inclusion of a rotatable joystick similar to the one used in Ikari Warriors, in addition to the traditional set of shoot and jump buttons, allowing the player to adjust his character's aim in one of eight directions by rotating the joystick clockwise or counter-clockwise. This allows the player to keep their aim in one direction while moving in another, even while crawling or jumping.

The power-up system is similar to the one featured in Heavy Barrel (a previous Data East game), in which the player collect keys after defeating certain enemy soldiers (each player can possess up to six keys at a time). At the end of each stage the player will enter a weapon storage room in which various new weapons and other power-ups can be released from their lockers depending on the number of keys in the player's possession. When the player loses a life, he will drop all the weapons and keys he has in his possession and they can only be recovered if they do not fall off-screen.

The two types of weapons that can be purchased in the weapon stores are special guns that will replace the player's default rifle (or whatever other special weapon he may be currently wielding) and backpack weapons that are launched by pushing the joystick up while pressing the shoot button. Both types of weapons have limited ammunition and when the player's special gun runs out of ammo, he will revert to the default rifle. Additional ammo for the player's current weapon can be purchased in stores as well when available. Other power-ups includes a "supercharge" upgrade that improves the firepower of the player's current weapon (this upgrade is lost when the player loses a life), a barrier that provides temporary invincibility, and extra lives.

There are a total of nine stages, each with its set of unique obstacles and adversaries that the player must overcome. Before the final stages, the keys he has collected during the penultimate stage can be used to free the player's relatives before the final battle with Crimson King. The ending varies depending on how many family members the player has rescued.

Ports

Mega Drive/Genesis
The Mega Drive port in Japan was published by Data East in 1991. Its Genesis counterpart in North America was published by Sega the same year. The Mega Drive/Genesis version was developed by Data East with the companies ISCO and Opera House.

Although the graphics and stage designs are similar to the arcade version, the controls were changed to accommodate for the lack of a rotatable joystick. Four control configurations are available. The default controls allows the player to aim at the direction he is moving and keep his aim steady by holding down the B button. The other configurations are closer to the arcade version's controls, allowing the player to rotate the character's aim clockwise, counter-clockwise, or alternate between the two. The player fires his weapon in automatically, which can be toggled on and off with the A button. Unlike the arcade version, the home version is single-player only.

Home computers
Around the same time that the game was released to the Mega Drive/Genesis console in Japan and North America, Ocean Software published in Europe computer ports for the Commodore 64, ZX Spectrum, Amstrad CPC, Amiga, and the Atari ST, all of which were developed by Special FX.

The Spectrum version has a completely redesigned, chunky, cartoony style to it. It had push screen scrolling and very few on-screen colours due to hardware limitations, but it is considered by many to be one of the stand out technical achievements for the hardware. It was ported to the Amstrad CPC in a stripped-down version as was common for the era, due to the two computers sharing the same processor. It is missing the music and colour of the 128 Spectrum version and has less buyable weapons at the end of each stage.

Reception

In Japan, Game Machine listed Midnight Resistance on their December 15, 1989 issue as being the fifth most-successful table arcade unit of the month.

MegaTech magazine praised the weapons and action in the Mega Drive/ Genesis port, but criticized the lack of two-player mode and said that the game was too easy.

The ZX Spectrum port was awarded a score of 90% in Sinclair User and 93% in CRASH magazine. It was also included in their 100 best Spectrum games ever made, reaching number 10. The Spectrum version was also voted number 11 in the Your Sinclair Readers' Top 100 Games of All Time.

The Commodore 64 port received a score of 90% from Zzap!64 magazine. It was also included in their top 100 C64 games ever made.

References

External links

Midnight Resistance at Arcade History
Midnight Resistance at Atari Mania
Midnight Resistance at Gamebase 64

1989 video games
Amiga games
Amstrad CPC games
Arcade video games
Atari ST games
Commodore 64 games
Data East arcade games
Data East video games
Golden Joystick Award winners
Ocean Software games
Run and gun games
Sega Genesis games
Video games developed in Japan
Video games scored by Hitoshi Sakimoto
ZX Spectrum games